Zahlbach may refer to:

Zahlbach (Mainz), a former independent municipality, now part of the town Mainz, Germany
Zahlbach (Mergbach), a river of Hesse, Germany, tributary of the Merkbach
Zahlbach, a district of the municipality Burkardroth, Bavaria, Germany